The Cebollatí River is a Uruguayan river that rises in Cuchilla Grande (Big Ridge), flows southwest to northeast and forms a border between Treinta y Tres and Rocha.

Features and location

It forms in Cuchilla Grande, then joins the Rio Olimar Grande and flows into the Merin Lagoon in Treinta y Tres.

In October 2009 the National Hydrographic Institute of Uruguay started operating a free raft service across the Cebollatí River; this service allows commuters to cross from Treinta y Tres to Rocha in a wooden raft between the localities of Cebollatí and Charqueada.

See also
List of rivers of Uruguay
Lagoon Mirim#Location
Olimar Grande River

References

External links

Rand McNally, The New International Atlas, 1993.
GEOnet Names Server 

Rivers of Uruguay
Rivers of Treinta y Tres Department
Rivers of Rocha Department
Rivers of Lavalleja Department